Jilotepec de Molina Enríquez, known as Jilotepec de Abasolo until 1986, and commonly known as Jilotepec, is a city located in the northwest zone of the State of Mexico in Mexico. The name comes from Náhuatl, meaning "hill of corncobs". It is the municipal seat and largest city of the municipality of Jilotepec (not Jilotepec de Molina Enríquez). It is located in hilly and forested terrain about an hour's drive from Mexico City and the state capital of Toluca, 40 minutes from San Juan del Río, 30 minutes from Tula and 20 minutes from Tepeji. The Mexico City–Querétaro highway and the new Transoceanic Freeways that unite the coasts of Mexico from Veracruz to Michoacán converge within its territory.

The municipality of Jilotepec is located 1670 meters above sea level and covers an area of 586.53 km2, being the fourth-largest municipality in the State of Mexico. According to INEGI data, Jilotepec de Abasolo has a population of 71,624. The municipality borders the municipalities of Polotitlan, Aculco, Timilpan, Chapa de Mota, Villa del Carbón, Soyaniquilpan and the state of Hidalgo. At the end of the 18th century, Jilotepec was part of the municipality of Huichapan, in the District of Tula. On March 11, 1824, Jilotepec de Abasolo was created from parts of Huichapan Chapa de Mota, Villa del Carbón, and Acambay.

The town of Jilotepec de Molina Enríquez

The city had a population of 10,503 as of 2005.

The region was originally inhabited by Otomis then  conquered in 1379 by Acamapichtli the Aztec tlatoani (chief), later during the Viceroyalty of New Spain and the porfirian era, Jilotepec received waves of mostly Spanish and French settlers. After the Spanish Conquest, Jilotepec was recorded in ecclesiastical records as a village with a single priest, administrated by the Franciscans with the Brothers Alonso de Rangel and Antonio de Ciudad Rodrigo being the first to evangelize the area. Sometime in the middle of the 16th century, silver was discovered in Zacatecas and Guanajuato, leading to the construction of the Camino Real a Zacatecas (Royal Road to Zacatecas) with passed through>

Geography 
Jilotepec lies in the north of the state of Mexico. To its north is the state of Hidalgo, to the south are the municipalities of Chapa de Mota and Timilpan, to the southeast is Villa del Carbón, to the east is Soyanilquilpan, and to the west are Polotitlán and Aculco.

Political Geography 
There is one city in the municipality of Jilotepec, the municipal head Jilotepec de Molina Enríquez which is divided into six neighborhoods, or colonias: Colonia Centro, Javier Barrios, La Merced, El Deni, La Cruz de Dendho, and Xhisda.

There is only one village, or villa, the Villa de Canalejas

There are 23 towns, or pueblos: 

There are 24 small towns, or rancherías:

Physical Geography 
The primary geographical features of the region are fertile plains interrupted by hills and canyons. The municipality sits at the northern edge of the Trans-Mexican Volcanic Belt physiographic region on the Sierra Nevada mountain range. The municipality is further divided by the subregions of the plains and mountains of Querétaro and Hidalgo to the north, and the lakes and volcanoes of Anáhuac comprising a small part of the municipality to the south. It is the fifth largest municipality in the state of Mexico.

Geology 
The geological substrate of the municipality is primarily extrusive igneous rock, that is, volcanic in origin.  These rocks are notable for the presence of basaltic lava flows, deposits of basaltic ash, slag, and pyroclastic rocks. Many of the older buildings in Jilotepec were built using these basaltic rocks.

The soil is mostly luvisolic, comprises 75% of the municipality's soil, and is particularly suited to agricultural industry though susceptible to erosion. About 15% of the soil is vertisolic and is located in the east of the municipality. This soil is prone to contraction in the dry season and is suited for grasses and grazing.

The primary mineral resource of the region is kaolin, a white clay that is useful in porcelain and medicine making. Other minerals that can be found in the municipality include chalcedony and tezontle.

Hydrology 
Jilotepec is in the Alto Pánuco hydrologic region of the state of Mexico in the San Juan river basin. The most notable river in the municipality is the Coscomate which feeds into the Danxho reservoir and numerous streams such as Los Charcos, El Colorado, Dedeni, La Mina and 40 others. The Huapango reservoir is the municipality's largest at 120 million m3, followed by the Danxho with 31 million m3, and the Santa Elena with 5 million m3. In addition to other smaller streams and reservoirs the municipality is supplied with water by the San Pablo Huantepec spring which flows at 10 L/s.

The municipality has a good supply of underground water thanks to the high permeability of the soil in most of the region. The quality of the water is "acceptable" though it is contaminated with waste and untreated water, especially in the municipal head where the Coscomate River and Colorado Stream flow.

Fauna 
Jilotepec has not done an exhaustive survey of the wildlife within its municipal borders but they do have an informal registry of species. There is a diversity of frogs, lizards, and snakes (only three of which are venomous) in Jilotepec. The birds of the region concentrate around the forests and lakes and represent the greatest diversity of wildlife in the municipality. The mammals of the region include common herbivores and carnivores such as weasels, coyotes, squirrels, and possums.

Fish 
Only the charal is common to the region. It is commonly fished for food and typically dried. The charal has a wide tolerance for changes in weather common to the municipality throughout the year. Though it is easily found and commonly consumed, there is no industry actively exploiting the charal population in Jilotepec. Though not native to the region, carp (Cyprinus carpio) and largemouth bass (Micropterus salmoides) are commercially farmed, recently being introduced to the Huapango reservoir.









Flora 
Jilotepec's vegetation is predominantly semiarid grassland. In the north, the oak forests of Las Peñas are the largest in the state of Mexico. Throughout the municipality maguey, nopal, and tejocote are common, as well as many plants used in traditional medicinal recipes. There are two protected areas in Jilotepec: the state park El Llano Canalejas and the municipal park Las Sequoias as well as many smaller local parks and forests.

Climate 
The climate of Jilotepec varies between Cwa and Cwb on the Köppen climate classification, meaning it's in a temperate zone with dry winters and warm to hot summers. The southern portion of the region is noticeably cooler than the northern region which is closer to the warmer region of the Bajío. Likewise, rain is more intense in the south of the state than in the north.

Economy

6,416 hectares of the municipality is dedicated to the production of corn (the major crop), beans, wheat and livestock which is very important activity in the economic life of Jilotepec. Livestock includes cows pigs, sheep, and deer being a major dairy and meat producer. There are also farms with 8.5 millions birds for the production of meat and eggs. The raising of freshwater fish is a growing industry in the municipality as well.

The municipality has two types of industry, the first being family workshops which produce clothes, ceramics and pottery.  The second are factories focused on the production and embroidery of clothes for men and the manufacturing of plastic containers and other wool products.

References

External links 

  Municipal Official Site

Municipalities of the State of Mexico
Populated places in the State of Mexico
Otomi settlements
Municipality seats in the State of Mexico